The Dupnisa Cave, aka Dupnisa Caves, is a show cave located in Kırklareli Province, northwestern Turkey, close to Bulgarian-Turkish border. The cave itself, unlike what the original name suggests, is actually three, interconnected caves divided into two separate floors. Its name is derived from the Bulgarian word Dupnitsa (Дупница), related to the word for "hole".

Location

The Dupnisa Cave is accessible via the Kırklareli-Dereköy route (State Road ), from the Dereköy-Sarpdere or Kırklareli-Üsküp-Çukurpınar-Sarpdere routes from the north, and on the Vize-Poyralı , Poyralı-Demirköy  or the forementioned Demirköy-Sarpdere route from the south.

In 1913, Lyubomir Miletich recorded the existence of a Bulgarian-populated chiflik of 15-20 houses named Dunnitsa (Дунница). It was located just south of the modern day Bulgarian-Turkish border, most likely within the immediate vicinity of the cave. The chiflik's inhabitants were transported to Bulgaria after the Second Balkan War.

Formation and geology
The cave was formed as a result of the marble formation's erosion during the Toarcian age of the Early Jurassic epoch, dating back to around 180 Ma. It consists of three interconnected caves and has three entrances, arranged into two separate floors. Each cave is different in hydrologic properties, stalactites and stalagmites. Two caves, named "Kuru" ("Dry") and "Kız" ("Maiden"), are situated on the upper level running , of which the lower cave, called "Sulu" ("Wet"), is located  underneath. The "Kuru" is extremely rich in terms of stalactites, stalagmites, stalagnates and wall dripstones, reaching massive proportions. It is the source of the spring water flowing into Rezve Creek, the frontier between Turkey and Bulgaria. In contrast, the lower cave contains subterranean streams and lakes with draperies and boxworks over the lakes. The lower cave is at an elevation of  AMSL. The cave's exit is  higher than the entrance.

Tourism

The total dissimilarity and variety of the caves make them an attractive tourist destination. The cave was opened to tourism in 2005, and it is the only show cave in East Thrace.

The upper cave, "Kız", is not open to the public due to the approximate 60,000 total bats of eleven different species dwelling on the walls and ceilings of the cave. The "Kuru" cave is open year-round. The main entrance enters "Sulu" Cave, which is followed by a paved gallery complete with handrails. The passage to the area beyond  is permitted only to experienced cavers for exploring purposes.

At the end of the show cave in "Sulu", a staircase leads up to "Kuru" Cave. The main exit is at the end of the gallery at ground level. Return to the entry point is by a marked trail through the woods, which takes around 15 minutes to reach.

It was reported that the Dupnisa Cave was visited by over 17,000 domestic and foreign tourists within the first four months of 2012. The number of visitors reached 120,000 in 2013, according to the Deputy Director of Culture and Tourism in Kırklareli.

In response to the periodical abundance of bats, the cave is now closed from November 15 until May 15.

References

External links

Show caves in Turkey
Landforms of Kırklareli Province
Tourist attractions in Kırklareli Province
Demirköy District
Strandzha